SNK Gals' Fighters is a 2-dimensional 1-on-1 versus fighting game which appeared on the Neo Geo Pocket Color in 2000. The game was ported to the Nintendo Switch in the eShop on April 29, 2020, to celebrate the 30th anniversary of the Neo Geo system.

Gameplay 
Gals' Fighters features female characters from various SNK franchises, where the characters compete in the aptly named Queen of Fighters tournament, organized by a mysterious "Miss X", with whoever being able to defeat "Miss X" (in reality, Iori Yagami dressed as a woman) being given the K' Talisman, which grants any wish. The characters' sprites were drawn in the same anime super deformed style as other fighters on the system.

The game plays similar to other NGPC fighting games, such as King of Fighters R-1 and R-2, although slightly faster, and with 1-on-1 matches. It also features items that a player can equip to influence the matches; many of the items, however, have no effect on the gameplay.

Characters
Playable:
Mai Shiranui - Fatal Fury 2
Athena Asamiya - Psycho Soldier (outfit from The King of Fighters '99: Millennium Battle)
Yuri Sakazaki - Art of Fighting 2
Leona Heidern - The King of Fighters '96
Shermie - The King of Fighters '97
Nakoruru - Samurai Shodown
Shiki - Samurai Shodown 64
Akari Ichijou - The Last Blade

Hidden:
Whip - The King of Fighters '99
Yuki - The King of Fighters '97

Boss:
Miss X - The King of Fighters '95

Reception
Game Informer gave the Neo Geo Pocket version an overall score of 7.5 out of 10 praising the game of being a solid fighter in the Neo Geo collection and the added feature of winning and losing items and giving the characters different abilities, although giving criticism to the game as being too easy even when set on the hardest difficulty concluding “good game, but inferior when stacked up against the recently released Match the Millennium.”

In 2023, Time Extension identified SNK Gals' Fighters as one of the best games for the NGPC.

See also
 SNK Heroines: Tag Team Frenzy

References

External links
 SNK Gals' Fighters Official English Website (also featuring Gals' Fighters Hidden Characters)
 SNK Gals' Fighters Official Japanese Website

2000 video games
2D fighting games
Aicom games
Code Mystics games
Fighting games
Multiplayer and single-player video games
Neo Geo Pocket Color games
Nintendo Switch games
SNK games
Video games developed in Japan
Video games featuring female protagonists